Of the Sun is the fifth studio album by Polish band Trupa Trupa. It was released on 13 September 2019 under Giltterbeat Records.

The album focuses on the issues that Europe faces, including populism and the holocaust.

Critical reception
Of the Sun was met with universal acclaim reviews from critics. At Metacritic, which assigns a weighted average rating out of 100 to reviews from mainstream publications, this release received an average score of 81, based on 7 reviews.

Track listing

References

2019 albums